Love's Fire is a collection of short plays by American writers based on Shakespeare's Sonnets. It was commissioned and premiered by The Acting Company in its 1997-98 season.

Plays
"Bitter Sauce" by Eric Bogosian, inspired by Sonnet 118  
"Hydraulics Phat Like Mean" by Ntozake Shange, inspired by Sonnet 128,  Original Music by Chico Freeman , Choreography by Dyane Harvey  
"140" by Marsha Norman, inspired by Sonnet 140  
"Terminating" by Tony Kushner, inspired by Sonnet 75  
"Painting You" by William Finn, inspired by Sonnet 102  
"Waiting for Philip Glass" by Wendy Wasserstein, inspired by Sonnet 94  
"The General of Hot Desire" by John Guare, inspired by Sonnets 153 and 154 and The Golden Legend of Jacobus de Varagine, Original Music by Adam Guettel

References

External links
Review of 1998 New York Production at New York Magazine
Review of 1998 New York Production at Curtain Up

Plays and musicals based on works by William Shakespeare
Off-Broadway musicals